Dexit was a publicly traded company in Toronto, Ontario, Canada. It offered a rechargeable, contactless, stored-value smart key tag used for electronic payment in on-line or off-line systems locally in 2003, until it stopped operating in 2006. Dexit was rebranded in 2007 and its name changed to Hosted Data Transaction Solutions Inc (HDX) and is currently now known as Posera.

Instead of coins or cards (and PIN), Dexit used an RFID key tag device associated with funds transferred from ordinary bank accounts. There is no link to access the accounts from the key tag, a feature to guard against the abuse of lost key tags. Accounts can be filled up from the Dexit website, by telephone, at participating merchants, or through pre-approved bank account or credit card balance transfers.

A partnership between small retailers, Dexit Inc., TD Canada Trust, National Bank of Canada, Telus Mobility, Bell Canada in Toronto's downtown, and a few retailers in and around Toronto. There were plans to expand to the rest of Toronto in 2005; however, this does not appear to have occurred.

In the summer of 2006, Dexit announced a restructuring, and nearly all payment terminals have been removed from stores.  Dexit is also offering refunds of all funds that have been stored on Dexit Tags.

Dexit later became HDX Solutions Inc.

See also
Visa Cash
Mondex
Octopus card
Digital wallet
Oyster card

References

External links
 Dexit

Payment systems